Miguel Eduardo Flórez López (born 21 February 1996) is a Colombian cyclist, who currently rides for UCI Continental team . In May 2019, he was named in the startlist for the 2019 Giro d'Italia.

Major results
2016
 1st Stage 3 Volta a Portugal do Futuro
 8th Overall Vuelta a la Independencia Nacional
2019
 5th Overall Vuelta al Tachira
 1st Stage 8
2020
 5th Overall Vuelta a San Juan
1st Stage 5
 5th Overall Tour Colombia
 10th Circuito de Getxo

2023
 3rd Circuito Ciclístico Jenesano

Grand Tour general classification results timeline

References

External links

1996 births
Living people
Colombian male cyclists
Sportspeople from Bogotá
21st-century Colombian people